Rinat Leonidovych Akhmetov (born on 21 September 1966) is a Ukrainian billionaire and businessman. He is the founder and president of System Capital Management (SCM), and is the wealthiest man in Ukraine. As of January 2023, he was listed as the 639th richest person in the world with an estimated net worth of US$5.7 billion. 

Akhmetov is the owner and president of the Ukrainian football club Shakhtar Donetsk. From 2006–2007 and 2007–2012, Akhmetov was a member of the Ukrainian Verkhovna Rada (parliament) for the Party of Regions.

Early life
Rinat Akhmetov was born in Donetsk, Ukrainian SSR, to a working-class family. He is an ethnic Volga Tatar and a practicing Sunni Muslim. His father, Leonid Akhmetov was a coal-miner. His mother, Nyakiya Nasredinovna, was a shop assistant.

Akhmetov had an older brother, Igor, who also worked as a coal miner but had to resign due to work-related health complications. Igor died on 24 January 2021.

Akhmetov earned a bachelor's degree in economics from Donetsk National University in 2001.

Business career

Beginnings
Details regarding Akhmetov's past, how he obtained his wealth after the fall of communism in Ukraine, and his activities between 1985 and 1995, remain controversial. Akhmetov has stated in interviews that he successfully made risky business investments in the first years after the collapse of the Soviet Union. In 2010, denied he inherited any money from Akhat Bragin or anyone else: "I have earned my first million by trading coal and coke, and spent the money on assets that no one wanted to buy. It was a risk but it was worth it". Many publications in Ukraine and other European countries have made claims about Akhmetov's alleged "criminal past", some of which later retracted their statements.

In his documentary book Donetsk Mafia: Anthology, Ukrainian author Serhiy Kuzin claims Akhmetov held the role of a 'mafia thug' in his early years. According to Hans van Zon, Professor of Central and Eastern European Studies in the University of Sunderland, "As early as 1986, Rinat and his brother Igor were involved in criminal activities.". In 2008, the Donetsk Appellate Court ruled that the book was a work of plagiarism. The authors of the book, Borys Penchuk, Serhiy Kuzin and the Anticorruption Foundation, were obliged to pay UAH200,000 in compensation for a breach of copyright to Oleksandr Kuchinsky, the editor-in-chief of Criminal Express regional weekly and the author of The Chronicle of Donetsk Banditry book. Serhiy Kuzin used the materials from those editions to write his own book.

In the 1980s, Akhmetov acted as an assistant to Akhat Bragin, whom law enforcement agencies regarded as a powerful crime boss, allegedly in the illegal cloth trading business. Andrew Wilson, a scholar specializing in Ukrainian politics, categorized Akhmetov as an alleged former 'enforcer' and 'leader' of "[Akhat] Bragin's 'Tatar' clan", responsible for the use of "mafia methods to push aside the 'red directors' of the Industrial Union of Donbas (ISD)". By the early 1990s, Akhmetov began acquiring property in Donetsk allegedly by means of extortion with the assistance of Volodymyr Malyshev, Lieutenant-General of The Head of Ministry of Internal Affairs Department in Donetsk Oblast. 

Malyshev, now a member of Ukraine's Parliament on the committee controlling law enforcement, is accused by Kuzin of using his position to do away with previously existing police records concerning Akhmetov shortly before becoming chief of security for Akhmetov's company. "In [the 1990s], Akhmetov was very different – he was totally private with no public persona, and was trying to find ways to deal with his 'difficult past'", noted U.S. ambassador William Taylor, citing prominent Ukrainian businessman Serhiy Taruta. Further in that article cited the answer of the spokesperson for Akhmetov addressed to the Kyiv Post: "We don't know whether this phrase is authentic and what it actually means. Although, any accusations of Mr Akhmetov's involvement in criminal structures is slander."

In October 1995, Bragin, president of Shakhtar Donetsk football club, was killed in a mysterious bombing along with six of his bodyguards at the team's stadium during a match. Some rumours associate Akhmetov with the death of Bragin. Following the assassinations, Akhmetov is said to have "inherited a vast financial empire from Bragin". Akhmetov himself recalls that Akhat was a very close friend of him, his death was a big tragedy for him personally, and he narrowly escaped the explosion himself. “Many say that the bomb detonated in the box (at the stadium). It is a lie. The explosion happened in the tunnel (leading to the box area),” he said. “We arrived at the stadium together, five minutes late. His car pulled up first, mine was second. Because we were late, he left his car and rushed inside without waiting for me. The gap was like five seconds, no more than that. The explosion happened when I opened the door of my car.”

Akhmetov headed Dongorbank, formerly Akceptbank, in 1995.

In September 1999, an official Ukrainian Ministry of Internal Affairs report titled the "Overview of the Most Dangerous Organized Crime Structures in Ukraine" identified Akhmetov as a leader of an organized crime syndicate. The report tied the group to money laundering, financial fraud, and the control of numerous large and fictitious companies. The report also says that the group's activities "have been stopped," and says further that their criminal natures "have not been confirmed". In a written statement, System Capital Management said that the internal affairs report “has been fully and publicly shown to be a fraud and a forgery” — conclusions that SCM noted were “reached and publicly disclosed in November 2011” by a Ukrainian parliamentary committee and the Ministry of Interior.

Released in a WikiLeaks diplomatic cable, Volodymyr Horbulin, one of Ukraine's most respected policy strategists and former presidential advisor, told the U.S. Ambassador to Ukraine in 2006 that the Party of Regions, which "enjoyed deep pockets, being largely financed by billionaire Donetsk boss Rinat Akhmetov" is partly composed of "pure criminals" and "criminal and anti-democracy figures". In a U.S. diplomatic cable dated 3 February 2006, then U.S. Ambassador John Herbst referred to Akhmetov's Party of Regions as "long a haven for Donetsk-based mobsters and oligarchs" and called Akhmetov the "godfather" of the Donetsk clan. 

In 2014, Rinat Akhmetov's support of the peace process in Donbas and his assistance to civilians in Donetsk and Luhansk regions were highly appreciated by the United States. U.S. Ambassador to Ukraine, Geoffrey R. Pyatt who stated that he highly appreciates the efforts of Rinat Akhmetov “who has done probably more than anyone in this country to deliver food and clothes to victims of the violence occurring in Donbas”.

After Ukraine's Orange Revolution of late 2004, in an attempt to fight corruption, several prominent businessmen who were also Party of Regions members came under criminal investigation. In 2011, Hennadiy Moskal, who in 2005 acted as the Deputy Minister of Internal Affairs of Ukraine, gave an interview to Ukrainian magazine Профиль (profil-ua), where he claimed to have been under Presidential orders in 2005 to investigate and audit Akhmetov for his alleged role in organized crime. Concrete evidence was never officially revealed against him, nor his company.

According to Moskal, the MVS investigated all incidents related to missing people in 1990s in Donetsk region, who had any property left, and its current owners. No connections with Rinat Akhmetov and his entourage were found. Looking back, Moskal concluded that "we had nothing on Akhmetov in 2005". According to political journal's Post-Soviet Affairs, and The Nation, Akhmetov was investigated on murder charges and for his alleged role in organized crime in the Donetsk region. To avoid prosecution he was prompted to flee the country to Monaco. 

In June 2005, Serhiy Kornich, then head of the Interior Ministry's economic crimes department, stated publicly that Akhmetov was "the head of [an] organized crime group." That year, Borys Kolesnikov, a friend and associate who had been tied to Akhmetov since the 1980s, was arrested on charges of extortion and conspiracy to assassinate a rival Donetsk businessman. Charges against Akhmetov and Kolesnikov were dropped in 2006 amid a significant rise in political power by the former, and the cooperation of the Yuschenko government, ending Akhmetov's exile.

SCM Group
Akhmetov founded System Capital Management Group (JSC "SCM") in 2000. SCM is the largest diversified financial and industrial group in Ukraine (for example, in 2013, the share of SCM in Ukraine's GDP was 3.9%), which is also represented in 7 countries in Europe and North America. The structure of SCM Group includes more than 500 companies employing about 200 thousand people.

SCM's main areas of interest and activities are metallurgy and coal mining, power generation, telecommunications, and banking. In various periods, Akhmetov controlled from 90% to 100% of the shares of SCM. He has been its sole proprietor since 2009.

The main assets of Rinat Akhmetov, according to information for 2022, include the following companies:
SCM Holdings
Metinvest (mining and metallurgical business)
DTEK (energy industry)
First Ukrainian International Bank (finance)
Ukrtelecom (telecommunication business)
ESTA Holding (real estate)
Corum Group (mechanical engineering; formerly Ukrvuglemash and Mining Machines)
UMG Investments (investments; formerly United Mineral Group)
Portinvest, Lemtrans, Transinvest holding (transport business)
HarvEast Holding (agriculture)
FC Shakhtar Donetsk (sport)
According to Serhiy Holovnev and Yuriy Vinnichuk, in 2018 SCM enterprises paid UAH 90.2 billion, or 22.6% of all tax revenues to the government budget of Ukraine.

In H1 2022, SCM paid about €1.2 billion in taxes to the national budget, becoming the country’s biggest private taxpayer in the wartime.

Mariupol-based Azovstal and Illich Iron and Steel Works were the backbone of Akhmetov's steel business. Other steel companies, Zaporizhstal and Kametstal, had to curtail production significantly.

Akhmetov's DTEK has lost 70% of renewables facilities and 30% of thermal power generation plants.

Critics point out that at different times SCM used the political conjuncture for its development. For example, in 2004 Akhmetov and Pinchuk privatized Kryvorizhstal for $0.8 billion. But in 2005, re-privatization was carried out: the plant was bought by Mittal Steel Company for $4.8 billion. In January 2014 SCM businesses won 31% of all state tenders. 

At the same time, researchers note that SCM Group has been trying to be a transparent corporation since its inception. SCM was one of the first in Ukraine to begin publishing social reports (2007). It was several times the leader in the rankings of Ukraine's "Socially Responsible Companies", and in 2011, together with its subsidiaries Metinvest and DTEK, it entered the top five of the Index of Transparency and Accountability of Companies in Ukraine.

Wealth

Rinat Akhmetov has been number one in Korrespondent magazine annual Ukraine's Top 50 richest people rating with the estimated wealth of:

 2006 – $11.8 bn
 2007 – $15.6 bn
 2008 – $31.1 bn
 2009 – $9.6 bn
 2010 – $17.8 bn
 2011 – $25.6 bn
 2012 – $17.8 bn
 2013 – $18.3 bn
 2014 – $10.1 bn
 2019 – $7.7 bn
 2020 – $7.7 bn
 2021 – $8.5 bn

Forbes The World's Billionaires rating:
 2006 – No. 451 with a net worth of $1.7 bil
 2007 – No. 214 with $4.0 bn
 2008 – No. 127 with $7.3 bn
 2009 – No. 397 with $1.8 bn
 2010 – No. 148 with $5.2 bn
 2011 – No. 39 with $16 bn.
 2012 – No. 39 with $16 bn.
 2013 – No. 47 with $15.4 bn.
 2015 – No. 201 with $6.7 bn.
 2016 – No. 771 with $3.4 bn.
 2017 – No. 359 with $4.6 bn
 2018 – No. 334 with $5.5 bn
 2019 – No. 272 with $6 bn
 2020 – No. 875 with $2.4 bn
 2021 – No. 327 with $7.6 bn
 2022 – No. 687 with $4.3 bn

In 2018 Akhmetov's fortune was valued at approx. $5.9 billion. Bloomberg reported that he was the richest person in Ukraine and that he had regained all of his losses suffered after the conflict with Russia in 2013–2014. Rinat Akhmetov's key assets are based in the east and south of Ukraine. Since the beginning of the war in February 2022, he has lost two thirds of his fortune, including steel, energy and agricultural assets. Overall, the invaders have destroyed about 70 companies owned by Rinat Akhmetov.

In February 2023 all of Akhmetov's assets in Russian occupied Donbas were confiscated. The local Russian installed authorities justified this by declaring Akhmetov a "rogue individual."

Political activity
Akhmetov has been noted as a financier and unofficial leader of the Party of Regions political party.

Following the Orange Revolution, Akhmetov was pivotal in arranging a lasting relationship between his employee and close friend Paul Manafort and defeated presidential candidate Viktor Yanukovich. 

In a September 2007 diplomatic cable released between prominent Ukrainian business partners Serhiy Taruta, Vitaliy Haiduk, and U.S. ambassador William Taylor, Taruta alleged that Akhmetov had in 1997 persuaded Ukrainian president Leonid Kuchma to appoint Viktor Yanukovych governor of Donetsk oblast, who then made Haiduk his deputy. Akhmetov's spokesperson refused comment on the matter, and Haiduk denied the conversation taking place.

Akhmetov was elected as a member of Ukraine's Verkhovna Rada (parliament) during the 2006 Ukrainian parliamentary election, as a member of the Party of Regions. Akhmetov was reelected during the 2007 parliamentary election, again as a member of the Party of Regions. He only appeared once in the Verkhovna Rada building during his inauguration. 

Leader of the party's faction in the Verkhovna Rada, Oleksander Yefremov, has mentioned that Rinat Akhmetov provides "substantive support" to the faction by providing what he referred to as "functioning expert groups he established that are counseling on draft laws". In December 2011 Akhmetov announced he was not going to participate in the 2012 parliamentary election.

U.S. diplomatic cables revealed that Akhmetov posted $2 million bail in 2007 for the release of three members of the Party of Regions, including former Sumy Governor Volodymyr Shcherban, who was accused of election rigging, extortion, tax evasion and abuse of office.

Reaction to the south-eastern conflict in Ukraine
Akhmetov has denied claims made by Pavel Gubarev (self-proclaimed "People's Governor" of the Donetsk People's Republic) in an interview published in the Russian state-controlled newspaper Rossiyskaya Gazeta on 12 May 2014. "Pavel Gubarev alleges that I bribed two thirds of the activists. I am firmly stating that I have never given and will never give anyone even a cent of bribe", replied Akhmetov. 

According to Gubarev, Akhmetov has financed the separatist movement in the region, and that the separatists "all took money" from Akhmetov and others, saying that "As it turned out, two-thirds of the activists were supported by the oligarch Akhmetov". On 10 May 2014, Akhmetov's Metinvest company announced it would be forming an unarmed militia of steelworker employees to stop looting by separatists and criminals in the city of Mariupol. 

In a 19 May (2014) breaking news message on Ukrayina TV, Akhmetov claimed the representative "of this Donetsk People's Republic" were committing "genocide of Donbas". At his initiative the next day a so-called Peace March was held in the stadium Donbass Arena in Donetsk accompanied by cars beeping their horns at noon. Akhmetov has vowed that "siren [will be] ringing every day at noon across all of Donbas until peace is established".

Akhmetov is helping the victims of the War in Donbas in South-Eastern Ukraine. As of March 2014 he had allocated UAH 35 million for this assistance. The Rinat Akhmetov Humanitarian Centre was established in August 2014 to provide maximum assistance to all civilians of Donetsk and Luhansk Regions affected by the military actions. The centre has pooled resources of the Foundation and all of SCM Group's businesses and FC Shakhtar. The activity of the centre is dedicated to financial, humanitarian, medical and psychological assistance for the victims of the conflict in the South-Eastern Ukraine, and evacuation from the hot spots in the East of Ukraine.

In August 2014 Akhmetov's Foundation for Development of Ukraine started a project called Humanitarian Aid Drives. The purpose of this project is the regular delivery of food and children's packages to Donbas. As of October 2016 over 10 million food packages were provided to IDPs and residents of 57 districts and settlements of the Donetsk and Luhansk regions. The package includes flour, sugar, cereals, oats, tinned foods, sunflower oil, stew, pasta, canned corn, gingerbreads and condensed milk.

Akhmetov has made numerous statements, since March 2014, appealing for integrity of Ukraine and finding peaceful solutions of the crisis. He believes decentralization should be part of this peaceful solution.

In March 2017, protesters attacked Akhmetov's offices in Russian controlled areas. Pro-Russian separatists in the Donbas region seized control of companies owned by energy conglomerate DTEK, and steel company Metinvest, both owned by Akhmetov. Companies in the region controlled by the Luhansk People's Republic (LPR) took control of several Akhmetov owned companies.

Continued protests throughout 2017 led to allegations of corruption and profiteering between Akhmetov and President Petro Poroshenko, specifically over pricing for domestic coal suppliers and the buyout of DTEK debts by the government. On 27 August 2020, the Specialised Anti-Corruption Prosecutor's Office (SAPO) dismissed the criminal case concerning Rotterdam+ due to the lack of elements of crime. According to the SAPO, the investigation of suspects was closed as Rotterdam+ had not generated any losses

Quitting media business 
In November 2021 Ukrainian president Volodymyr Zelensky accused Akhmetov of being enlisted to help plan a coup against him by Russia. Akhmetov has denied these claims, calling the allegations "an absolute lie." The allegations were the culmination of a dispute between Zelensky and Akhmetov, as part of Zelensky anti-corruption clean-up efforts. Akhmetov is a noted opponent of Zelensky. His TV channels backed one of his opponents in the 2019 election and have been increasingly critical in coverage of Zelensky. Especially since the government failed to reimburse one of his energy company subsidiaries for green energy purchased by state companies. 

Akhmetov says that he does not interfere with the channels’ editorial policy and that it's the "guests who come to the channels" and not the channels themselves that criticize Zelensky. In turn, Zelensky's MPs have boycotted what they view as hostile media. Akhmetov announced on 11 July  2022 that he would surrender licences of top television channels to the government and shut down both print and internet media to comply with so-called “de-oligarchisation” legislation aimed at curbing the influence of oligarchs. “I made an involuntary decision that my investment company SCM will exit its media business,”  Akhmetov said in a statement.

The Minister of Justice, Denys Maliuska, said that Rinat Akhmetov no longer fits the definition of an oligarch, as he has left the media business, and his business partner Vadym Novinsky has completed the mandate of the Peopleʼs Deputy.

Activities during the Russian invasion 

Financial Times reports that Rinat Akhmetov has allocated €100 million in humanitarian aid and support for the Ukrainian military during the 2022 Russian invasion of Ukraine.

On February 22, as hundreds took to the streets of Mariupol to protest Russia's actions, Akhmetov announced SCM would pay ₴1 billion ($34 million) in taxes in advance to shore up state finances.

The Azovstal plant in Mariupol, owned by Akhmetov, was the site of fierce fighting during the Siege of Mariupol and was almost completely destroyed.

In the comment to The Wall Street Journal Akhmetov stated that both steel plants in Mariupol were under Ukrainian control, but that the plants were temporarily shut down, saying, "Russian troops are turning Mariupol into rubble, killing Mariupol residents, and bombing the plants," he said. "Under no circumstances will these plants operate under Russian occupation."

As a result of the invasion, Akhmetov's fortune dropped from nearly $14 billion to less than $6 billion in just two weeks, and may likely be much less, according to Forbes. According to Akhmetov, "A total ceasefire, complete withdrawal of Russian troops from Ukraine, and full restoration of the internationally recognized borders of Ukraine. That includes the Crimea and Donbas" were his terms of a Ukrainian victory in the conflict. "My Foundation is helping Ukrainians survive by providing water, food, medicines, and any help we can give here and now. SCM businesses are helping the army and territorial defense forces to defend our sovereignty, our freedom, and independence, and win the war ... I am working with my company and my people. I am doing everything I can. I am confident that other people are doing the same."

In December 2022, the Washington Post called Mr Akhmetov Ukraine's biggest private donor during the war, who provided over $100 million in military and humanitarian aid, "from drones to food". 

As of January 2023, the SCM businesses, the Rinat Akhmetov Foundation and the Shakhtar football club provided assistance to Ukraine, the military and civilians for UAH 4.3 billion, or about $133 million. Assistance reached more than 18 million people across the country.

The Saving Lives initiative established by Metinvest, in concert with the Rinat Akhmetov Foundation, was meant to prevent a food crisis in Ukraine in the wartime. Contributions from the international partners and benefactors has helped provide 374,130 people with many kinds of assistance. It hands over food packages, hygiene kits, and medicines to Dnipropetrovsk, Zaporizhia, Donetsk, Kyrovohrad, Kherson, and Odessa regions, taking care of shelters, and supporting local administrations. 

Rinat Akhmetov's Steel Front is an initiative launched by businessman Rinat Akhmetov to support the Ukrainian Armed Forces and other defence forces during the Russian invasion of Ukraine that started in 2022. 
 
SCM's businesses provide an extensive support to the Armed Forces of Ukraine, territorial defenders, the National Guard, National Police, Main Intelligence Directorate, and other military and security units. Metinvest also works to protect conscripted employees, utility workers, rescuers, military doctors, representatives of the national media who work in the combat areas by providing transport, drones, protective engineering structures, body armour, protective equipment, and medical assistance. As of January 2023, Rinat Akhmetov's Steel Front initiative donated more than 1200 drones, 766 cars and special vehicles, more than 200,000 body armour items, including 150,000 bulletproof vests, 1 million litres of fuel to the Armed Forces of Ukraine, territorial defenders, and communities.

In January 2023, Akhmetov announced the launch of the Heart of Azovstal project to help Mariupol defenders and the families of fallen soldiers. He donated $25 million to finance the project. 

Metinvest is using its steel to make ‘hedgehogs’ slowing the advance of Russian tanks.

Shakhtar Donetsk, the football club sponsored by Akhmetov, opened this year Shelter Center at the Arena Lviv, since then it has received more than 2 thousand internal migrants from different regions of Ukraine. As of the end of August, there were 6,000 temporary accommodation places arranged by Metinvest at its social facilities. The shelter residents receive hot meals, food and hygienic kits. The company has arranged 850 accommodation places in six Dnipropetrovsk and Kyrovohrad communities.  
  
In total, the assistance covered 13.5 million people across the country. 

Since the beginning of Russia's full invasion of Ukraine, DTEK returned power to 6.7 million households in Kyiv and four Ukrainian regions. The company's power engineers respond swiftly to re-energise localities cut off electricity supply because of hostilities.

After the power plants in Kharkiv and Dnipropetrovsk oblasts were hit by Russian missile strikes, causing widespread blackouts in five regions of Ukraine, Rinat Akhmetov and DTEK Group decided to start helping restore electricity supply all over Ukraine, even in the areas not covered by DTEK power grid.

Since the outbreak of the war, Akhmetov's DTEK has been supplying free electricity worth UAH 350 million to medical and military facilities in Kyiv, Dnipropetrovsk, and Donetsk oblasts.

Metinvest has developed special chemical composition of steel to produce plates for body armour. The company has already provided 150,000 bulletproof vests to the army, the territorial defence forces, law enforcement agencies, and members of emergency rescue teams.

Highlighted by Bloomberg, the latest development of Metinvest's specialists is prefabricated dugouts, or portable steel war shelters for Ukrainian defenders. These are special shelters for strengthening trenches that can be used as a full-fledged field accommodation, and one such shelter costs about UAH 200,000 ($5,450). Like all other equipment and protective gear, Metinvest delivers the shelters to the military free of charge. The company has already sent 123 of them to the front lines.

Akhmetov told Forbes: "I am in Ukraine and I am not going to leave the country. I share the same feelings with all Ukrainians: I am sincerely waiting for the victory of Ukraine in this war."

From February 24 to early May 2022, Akhmetov's businesses as well as his Foundation and FC Shakhtar have donated almost US$72 million in humanitarian aid and support of the Armed Forces of Ukraine and the Territorial Defenсe Forces. On 25 May 2022, Akhmetov told Novoe Vremya that he was planning to sue the Russian Federation demanding “proper compensation for all losses and lost business”, which, according to him, has caused him a loss ranging from 17 billion to 20 billion US dollars. From February 24 to August 1, 2022, they have donated almost US$90 million. As of August 1, 2022, the SCM businesses, the Rinat Akhmetov Foundation and the Shakhtar football club provided assistance to Ukraine, the military and civilians for UAH 3 billion, or about $100 million. Assistance reached more than 11 million people across the country.

In June 2022, Akhmetov filed a lawsuit against the Russian Federation with the European Court of Human Rights for damages caused to his assets by Russia's military aggression against Ukraine, saying "this lawsuit is one of the first international legal steps against Russia to stop their ongoing crimes, destruction of the Ukrainian economy and the plundering of Ukrainian assets". It was reported that Akhmetov was suing for between $17 billion and $20 billion of losses.

Akhmetov has paid UAH 1.77 billion in taxes to budgets of all levels since the beginning of 2022, according to Interfax-Ukraine.

Assessment of Russia's actions 
In an interview with Radio Svoboda in March 2022, Akhmetov said that the worst thing in Russia's war against Ukraine is that civilians are suffering and dying. And Russia's military aggression is a war crime and a crime against humanity against Ukraine and Ukrainians.

Asked by the Ekonomichna Pravda about Putin and Russia, Akhmetov said that "Russia is an aggressor and Putin is a war criminal. It’s because Ukraine has always been a peaceful country, and has never attacked anyone."

In an interview with Forbes in March 2022 Akhmetov commented concerning Russian invasion of Ukraine: “What is unfolding here is a war crime and a crime against humanity, against Ukraine and the Ukrainians. This can neither be explained nor justified."

Vision of victory for Ukraine 
In an interview with Forbes Ukraine, Akhmetov noted that the victory for Ukraine is "a complete ceasefire, the withdrawal of Russian soldiers from Ukraine and a full restoration of Ukraine's internationally recognized borders. Including Donbass and Crimea."

Plans on recovery of Ukraine 
In a comment to Radio Svoboda, Akhmetov said he is confident that the time would come when Ukrainians would rebuild Ukraine, and stressed that he would personally invest all his strength and resources to restore Ukraine and become a prosperous country.

Akhmetov was asked by the Washington Post about his vision of Ukraine after the war, he called for a “new Marshall Plan” of hundreds of billions of dollars in investment and a country remade in the image of the West.   “The goal is to build a new, strong, and European Ukraine, a member of the European Union, with strong institutions, the rule of law, clear anti-corruption rules, a democratic political system, and fair treatment of citizens,” said Akhmetov.

Sports and patronage

Following the October 1995 bombing assassination of former team president Akhat Bragin at the team's stadium, Akhmetov (who had served as Bragin's right-hand man and himself narrowly missed the attempt on his life), subsequently inherited operation of the Shakhtar Donetsk football club. On 11 October 1996, Akhmetov was appointed president of the team Rinat Akhmetov envisioned Shakhtar as a winner of European cups, so he began restructuring the club to achieve this goal. He changed the approach to the club management and transferred the operational management to the professionals. Under his leadership, FC Shakhtar became the country's champion thirteen times, won the Ukrainian Cup thirteen times, took the Ukrainian Super Cup nine times, and won the UEFA Europa League Cup for the first time in the history of Ukraine.

In 2009, Donbas Arena stadium was built in Donetsk at Rinat Akhmetov's initiative. It's the first stadium in Eastern Europe that was designed and built to the elite UEFA standards; its capacity is over 50,000 people. Donbas Arena was named the best stadium of Euro 2012. It ranks among 25 best stadiums in the history of the Champions League.

FC Shakhtar had to leave its home city of Donetsk due to the War in Donbas in Ukraine. Since the spring of 2014, its training base has been located in Kyiv. The team changed multiple home stadiums, moving to Lviv (Arena Lviv, 2014–2017), Kharkiv (Metalist, 2017–2020), and finally Kyiv (NSC Olimpiyskiy, since 2020). 

In 2022, FC Shakhtar had to sign a stadium lease agreement with Legia Warsaw, because the Russia's war in Ukraine made it impossible to host international matches. 

Meanwhile, from August 2014 and until losing control of the stadium in 2017 the club's home stadium Donbas Arena served as a centre of humanitarian aid in Donetsk. Volunteers were unloading the food products, forming the individual sets and passing them to people in need there. During the fighting the Donbas Arena was seriously damaged as a result of shelling several times, the humanitarian aid distribution was continued.

In March 2017, a spokesperson for Akhmetov's foundation reported that humanitarian aid had been discontinued in the region after rebel organizations blocked access to the Shakhtar FC stadium, which serves as a center for relief efforts in the area.

Personal life
Rinat Akhmetov is married to Liliya Nikolaievna Smirnova (born 1965), and has two sons with her, Damir (born 1988) and Almir (born 1997).

Akhmetov owns London's most expensive penthouse at One Hyde Park, which was originally purchased for a reported $213 million as a portfolio investment and spent another reported $120 million to fix them up. The information about the deal was disclosed only four years later, in April 2011, after the asset has shown a steady annual rise. In May 2013, the property was transferred from his company, SCM, to himself.

In 2019, Gruppo Campari sold Villa Les Cèdres in Cap Ferrat, France, to Akhmetov for €200 million.

Through System Capital Management, he has an Airbus A319 Corporate Jet registered P4-RLA.

Philanthropy
Researcher Natalya Kolosova believes that Rinat Akhmetov is one of the first modern Ukrainian philanthropists who switched from spontaneous aid to a systematic approach. Since 2006, Akhmetov has been among the leading philanthropists of Ukraine. According to various sources, he is among the first in terms of the amount of funds allocated to charity.

In 2005, on the initiative of Rinat Akhmetov, the SCM corporate charitable foundation Development of Ukraine was created (since 2018, the Rinat Akhmetov Foundation). Main areas of its activity: national health, family, targeted assistance, dynamic culture, modern education. Since March 2008, the fund has been separated from the company and operates as a personal charitable foundation of Rinat Akhmetov, it maintains a partnership with SCM. This Foundation is one of the most famous charitable organizations in Ukraine.

During 2007–2013 there was the Foundation for Effective Governance founded by Rinat Akhmetov. The organization was supporting the authorities and civil society institutions of Ukraine in the development of programs for the long-term economic development of the state. During its work, the Foundation was preparing The Ukraine Competitiveness Report for the World Economic Forum and created two clusters in Lviv (IT and woodworking).

In August 2014, on the basis of the Foundation for Development of Ukraine, Rinat Akhmetov Humanitarian Center Pomozhem was created, which provides humanitarian assistance in the form of food packages, medicines, and psychological assistance to citizens. More than 800 thousand people received 12-kilogram packages every month. For three years, the Humanitarian Center saved more than 1,139,000 people from death, hunger and disease in eastern Ukraine and became the largest humanitarian mission in the country. More than 39 thousand people were evacuated from the combat zone by the resources of this organization. Since February 2017, the Humanitarian Center has been working only on the territory controlled by Ukraine. In the Donetsk region, the Humanitarian Center is one of the most famous charitable organizations (2018).

On 28 February 2018, the assistance the Rinat Akhmetov Humanitarian Center provided in the non-government controlled territory was put on hold and later banned at all. Over 500,000 people could not receive assistance any more. In 2020, help expanded its support to the entire country and forwarded its resources to help all residents of Ukraine, in order to protect them from the threat of the COVID-19 epidemic.

Starting from the year 2000, Rinat Akhmetov and his friend Igor Krutoy have been involved in a charity campaign on Saint Nicholas' Day in Donetsk and Donetsk Oblast, visiting children deprived of parental care, orphans and children in hospitals. In 2012, he donated $19 million to build an oncology research center.

According to Akhmetov's spokeswoman, Olena Dovzhenko, Akhmetov' salary for being a member of Ukraine's Verkhovna Rada (parliament) was traditionally deferred to charity.

In 2019, Ukrainian hospitals received 200 ambulances.

In March 2020, Rinat Akhmetov began to financially help in the fight against COVID-19. After meeting with the President of Ukraine Volodymyr Zelensky, he began to oversee a number of regions (Donetsk, Ivano-Frankivsk, Luhansk and Lviv Oblast) and individual cities (Kryvyi Rih).

In February 2020, Akhmetov allocated UAH 300 million to fight the coronavirus. About UAH 500 million was allocated in total to fight the coronavirus within the framework of the Fight against COVID-19 in Ukraine project - part of the Rinat Akhmetov - Saving Lives program, its Foundation purchased over 200 ventilators for Ukrainian hospitals.

Controversies

Euromaidan
During the 2013–14 Euromaidan anti-government protests, Akhmetov became a target of protest as he was seen as a symbol of oppression. In December 2013 protesters picketed his residence in London on several occasions, urging him to cut ties with incumbent president Viktor Yanukovych. In response, Akhmetov issued a statement condemning police brutality. On 31 December, Akhmetov reprimanded a group of protesters in public near his home in Donetsk.

Following the Euromaidan Revolution and Donbas War, Akhmetov lost more than half of his wealth. His net value went down from $11.2 billion to $2.9 billion in 2017. News reports suggest that much of his former wealth has been redistributed to Russian oligarchs.

Disputes in the media

When dealing with public criticism and allegations concerning his past, Akhmetov has utilized a team of PR consultants and lawyers to protect his image and name. His team often contests reports on him that they consider to be libelous, scandalous, or inaccurate. Critics accuse Akhmetov of going beyond protecting his name, but rather fear mongering investigative journalists. As many court cases occur in London for its lax free speech laws, critics accuse Akhmetov and his legal team of abuse of libel tourism. In January 2008, Akhmetov won a London libel court case "for damage to his reputation" for such claims, while several other statements about his "criminal past" have been retracted by the media.

In a statement issued by Akhmetov's lawyer Mark MacDougall, "Akhmetov has done a lot of work to protect his good name from false accusations, which might hurt the reputation of his family and business. As the result of it, many publications in Ukraine and other European countries had published retractions and apologies… [and] admitted that their claims are false. We think that these facts speak for themselves".

In 2007, the Kyiv Post, the primary English language daily newspaper in Ukraine, published an article relating to Mr. Akhmetov's business transactions relating to the Dniproenergo thermoelectric generator and the Kryvorizhstal steel mill. The newspaper published an apology stating that "on closer examination, we concluded these allegations relating to Mr. Akhmetov were untrue and have no basis in fact."

In 2007, the German language Swiss newspaper Neue Zürcher Zeitung ("NZZ") retracted defamatory statements from published earlier article regarding Mr. Akhmetov's early business career in the 1990s, noting that "there is no connection between Akhmetov … and organized crime in Ukraine" and "[t]he economic success of Akhmetov is not based by any means on criminally acquired starting capital."

In 2008, a judgment was obtained from the High Court of Justice in London after Obozrevatel, a Ukrainian language Internet publication refused to retract false and libelous statements alleging that Mr. Akhmetov was connected to criminal activity and violence. The Obozrevatel reporter (Tetiana Chornovol) interviewed his former classmates and neighbors, and delved into his early years. Following court pressure Obozrevatel issued an official apology stating: "The editorial hereby admits that there was unchecked and false information about Rinat Akhmetov present in the … articles … We hereby give our apologies to Rinat Akhmetov for the problems resulted from the above-mentioned publications." Tetiana Chornovol refused to issue an apology or acknowledge any wrongdoing.

The website GoLocalProv.com, based in Providence, Rhode Island, published in 2010 allegations that Akhmetov had ties to organized crime. Subsequently, PolitiFact engaged in a review of the allegations on GoLocalProv's site and disputed the sources on which they were based, stating that "key elements of the [GoLocalProv] story are false or unproven" and that the story presented "suspicions, suggestions, innuendo, and conspiracy theories" as fact. The GoLocalProv articles and audio shortly after their publishing were removed from the site. The publisher, Josh Fenton, explained that they disappeared for "technical reasons" and the radio station which aired the interview containing the allegations refused comment.

In 2010, the French daily newspaper Le Figaro issued a retraction of false allegations it published on 18 January 2010 regarding Akhmetov, due to a lack of evidence to support their claims, and issued an apology., 29 January 2010, "French newspaper issues apology to Ukrainian businessman Akhmetov for false report". Akhmetov's U.S. lawyer, Mark J. MacDougall, stated that "the editors and publisher of Le Figaro have acted responsibly in issuing a swift apology and correcting the false statements published about Mr. Akhmetov <...> Mr. Akhmetov values his reputation throughout Europe, and today’s action by Le Figaro recognizes that Mr. Akhmetov’s good name was put at risk when false accusations were published," he added. Le Figaro had claimed that Akhmetov was "a scandalous Ukrainian oligarch" and that he was "a bandit in the past".

In 2013, Akhmetov's legal representatives issued a press release in response to accusations in the media, which cited politicians and journalists, that implicated Akhmetov in the 1996 murder of Donetsk-based Ukrainian oligarch Yevhen Shcherban. The official statement stated that they "have not found any proof suggesting that Akhmetov was involved in Scherban's or other businessmen's killings. To be honest, some of the businessmen killed in the 1990s were Mr. Akhmetov's close friends."

Connection to Donald Trump's 2016 campaign
In January 2019, Paul Manafort's lawyers submitted a filing to the court, in response to the Robert Mueller Special Counsel's accusation that Manafort had lied to investigators while supposedly co-operating with the investigation. Through an error in redacting, the document accidentally revealed that while Manafort was Donald Trump's campaign chairman, Manafort met with Konstantin Kilimnik, gave Kilimnik polling data related to Donald Trump's 2016 United States Presidential campaign, and discussed a Ukraine-Russia peace plan for the Russo-Ukrainian War with Kilimnik. As a Russian Main Intelligence Directorate GRU agent, Konstantin Kilimnik is a known member of Russia's intelligence community. Although most of the polling data was reportedly public, some was private Trump campaign polling data managed by Brad Parscale. Manafort asked Kilimnik to pass the data to Ukrainians Serhiy Lyovochkin and Rinat Akhmetov.

Awards
 Order of Prince Yaroslav the Wise of the V class (2010)
 Full Chevalier of Order of Merit: I class in 2006, II class in 2004, III class in 2002
 Full Chevalier of the Miner's Glory Medal
 Honoured Worker of fitness and sports of Ukraine (1999)
 Award from President of Pakistan Sitara-e-Pakistan (2007) for merits to Pakistan
 Donetsk Citizens Recognition Prize in 2008 (est. by Donetsk City Council), in the nomination "Caring for the future"
 Honorary citizen of Donetsk (2006)

See also
 Business oligarch
 Ukrainian oligarchs
 History of post-Soviet Russia: The "loans for shares" scheme and the rise of the "oligarchs"
 Viktor Pinchuk
 Leonid Kuchma
 FC Shakhtar Donetsk
 Donbass Arena
 Timeline of investigations into Trump and Russia (2019)
 2006 Ukrainian parliamentary election
 2007 Ukrainian parliamentary election

Notes

References

External links
 
 Foundation for Development of Ukraine
 Foundation for Effective Governance 
 

1966 births
Living people
Businesspeople from Donetsk
Ukrainian people of Tatar descent
Party of Regions politicians
Fifth convocation members of the Verkhovna Rada
Sixth convocation members of the Verkhovna Rada
Ukrainian oligarchs
Ukrainian mass media owners
Ukrainian billionaires
Ukrainian philanthropists
Ukrainian football chairmen and investors
Tatar people
FC Shakhtar Donetsk non-playing staff
Ukrainian Muslims
People of the 2014 pro-Russian unrest in Ukraine
Donetsk National University alumni
Chevaliers of the Order of Merit (Ukraine)
Pro-Ukrainian people of the war in Donbas
SCM Holdings people
20th-century Ukrainian businesspeople
21st-century Ukrainian businesspeople
Politicians from Donetsk